Pangal is a village in the Kumbakonam taluk of Thanjavur district, Tamil Nadu, India.

Demographics 

As per the 2001 census, Pangal had a total population of 310 with 142 males and 168 females. The sex ratio was 1183. The literacy rate was 74.55%.

References 

 

Villages in Thanjavur district